The Lias Group or Lias is a lithostratigraphic unit (a sequence of rock strata) found in a large area of western Europe, including the British Isles, the North Sea, the Low Countries and the north of Germany. It consists of marine limestones, shales, marls and clays.

Lias is a Middle English term for hard limestone, used in this specific sense by geologists since 1833. In the past, geologists used Lias not only for the sequence of rock layers, but also for the timespan during which they were formed. It was thus an alternative name for the Early Jurassic epoch of the geologic timescale. It is now more specifically known that the Lias is Rhaetian to Toarcian in age (over a period of  20 million years between ) and thus also includes a part of the Triassic. The use of the name "Lias" for a unit of time is therefore slowly disappearing.

Subdivisions
In southern England, the Lias Group is often divided into Lower, Middle and Upper subgroups. In Southern England the Lias is divided into the following formations (from top to base):

 Bridport Sand
 Beacon Limestone
 Dyrham Formation
 Charmouth Mudstone
 Blue Lias

In the East Midlands Shelf the Lias is divided into the following formations (from top to base):

 Whitby Mudstone 
 Marlstone Rock 
 Charmouth Mudstone
 Scunthorpe Mudstone

In the Cleveland Basin in Yorkshire the Lias is divided into the following formations (from top to base):

 Whitby Mudstone
 Cleveland Ironstone
 Staithes Sandstone
 Redcar Mudstone

In South Wales only the Blue Lias is present.

The Lias is underlain by the Late Triassic Penarth Group, and overlain by the Inferior Oolite in most of England and the Dogger Formation or Ravenscar Group in the Cleveland Basin. In some areas there is a stratigraphic hiatus, and the rocks are overlain by Cretaceous marine sediments.

There are restricted outcrops of Lias rocks on the west coast of Scotland where, in the Sea of the Hebrides depositional basin on Skye, Raasay and Mull, the Broadford Beds Formation, Pabay Shale Formation and overlying Scalpay Sandstone Formation are assigned to the Lias Group.

In Dutch lithostratigraphy, the name Lias has no official status, however, it is often used for the lower part of the Altena Group in the subsurface of the Netherlands and the southern North Sea.

In northern Germany, the Lias Group consists of nine formations (from top to base):

 Opalinuston
 Dörnten-Formation
 Posidonia Shale
 Amaltheenton
 Capricorn Formation
 Raricostaten-Formation
 Arieten Sandstone
 Liassicus Sandstone
 Psilonoten Sandstone

See also
Blue Lias
 White lias

References

Notes

Literature
  (2007): Jurassic, in:  (eds.): Geology of the Netherlands, Royal Netherlands Academy of Arts and Sciences, pp. 107–125.

Early Jurassic Europe
Jurassic geology
Jurassic England
Jurassic Germany
Lithostratigraphy of England
Lithostratigraphy of Germany
Jurassic System of Europe